Something More may refer to:

Music
 Something More!, a 1964 Broadway musical with music by Sammy Fain

Albums
 Something More (Altars album), 2013
 Something More (Ginny Owens album), 2002

Songs
 "Something More" (Secondhand Serenade song), 2010
 "Something More" (Sugarland song), 2005
 "Something More" (Train song), 2001
 "Something More", by Aly & AJ from their 2016 album Into the Rush
 "Something More", by Chapterhouse from their 1991 album Whirlpool
 "Something More", by Ryan Malcolm, from his 2003 album Home
 "Something More", by Róisín Murphy from the 2020 album Róisín Machine

Other uses
 "Something More", a 1992 short story by Andrzej Sapkowski
 Something More (1999 film), a film starring Michael A. Goorjian
 Something More (2003 film), a film directed by Devon Gummersall
 Something More (novel), a 2001 novel by Paul Cornell
 Something More (radio program), commenced in 2015